Taubman Centers, Inc. is an American real estate investment trust headquartered in Bloomfield Hills, Michigan. The company invests in shopping centers, and is a subsidiary of Simon Property Group since 2020.

History
The company was founded in 1950 by A. Alfred Taubman. In 1953, it opened its first shopping center, North Flint Plaza, in Flint, Michigan. In 1964, the company opened its first enclosed mall, Southland Mall, in Hayward, California. In 1973, the company was incorporated as Taubman Centers, Inc. In 1987, the company sold Southridge Mall, in Milwaukee County, Wisconsin.  In 1992, the company became a public company via an initial public offering. In 1997, the company sold Queens Center to Macerich. In 1998, the company sold The Mall at Tuttle Crossing, Hilltop Mall, Marley Station, Meadowood Mall, Lakeforest Mall, Briarwood Mall, Stoneridge Shopping Center, The Falls Mall, and Columbus City Center to GM Pension Trust. The company continued to manage the properties until 2003 when they were sold again.

In 2000, the company traded Lakeside Mall Rodamco for full ownership of Twelve Oaks. In 2003, Simon Property Group attempted to acquire the company via a hostile takeover. In 2011, the company transferred The Pier Shops at Caesars to its lenders. In January 2012, Regency Square in Richmond, Virginia, was surrendered to creditors to avoid foreclosure. In January 2014, the company sold Arizona Mills and land for the proposed The Mall at Oyster Bay to Simon Property Group. In October 2014, the company sold The Mall at Partridge Creek, MacArthur Center, Northlake Mall, The Mall at Wellington Green, Stony Point Fashion Park, The Shops at Willow Bend, and Fairlane Town Center to Starwood Capital Group. In April 2015, the founder, Alfred Taubman, died at the age of 91. In March 2016, in a joint venture with Macerich, the company acquired Country Club Plaza in Kansas City, Missouri, for $660 million. In October 2020, Taubman sold Stamford Town Center for $20 million.

In February 2020, the company agreed to be acquired by Simon Property Group. This would have ended family control but the Taubman family will retain an ownership stake in its malls. In June 2020, Simon announced that it terminated the merger agreement with Taubman, before reversing its decision and modifying certain terms of the original merger agreement, including a modified purchase price of $43.00 per share in cash in November 2020. The merger closed in December 2020.

Investments
As of December 31, 2019, the company owned interests in 24 shopping centers in 11 U.S. states, Puerto Rico, South Korea, and China.

The company's largest tenants include Forever 21, The Gap, H&M, L Brands, Williams Sonoma, Urban Outfitters, Ascena Retail Group, Abercrombie & Fitch, Inditex, and Foot Locker.

Notable properties owned by the company include:
 Beverly Center - Los Angeles, California
 Cherry Creek Shopping Center - Denver, Colorado
 City Creek Center - Salt Lake City, Utah
 Country Club Plaza - Kansas City, Missouri (50/50 partnership with Macerich)
 Dolphin Mall - Miami, Florida
 Fair Oaks Mall - Fairfax, Virginia
 Great Lakes Crossing Outlets - Auburn Hills, Michigan
 International Plaza and Bay Street - Tampa, Florida
 Mall at Green Hills - Nashville, Tennessee
 The Mall at Millenia - Orlando, Florida (50% equity stake, managed by The Forbes Company)
 The Mall at Short Hills - Short Hills, New Jersey
 The Mall at University Town Center - Sarasota, Florida 
 The Mall of San Juan - San Juan, Puerto Rico
 Miami Worldcenter - Miami, Florida
 Sunvalley Shopping Center - Concord, California 
 Twelve Oaks Mall - Novi, Michigan
 Waterside Shops - Naples, Florida (50% equity stake, managed by The Forbes Company)
 Westfarms - West Hartford, Connecticut
 CityOn Zhengzhou Shopping Center - Zhengzhou, China
Starfield Hanam - Hanam, South Korea

References

External links
 

 
1992 initial public offerings
American companies established in 1950
Bloomfield Hills, Michigan
Companies based in Oakland County, Michigan
Companies formerly listed on the New York Stock Exchange
Financial services companies established in 1950
Real estate companies established in 1950
Shopping center management firms
2020 mergers and acquisitions
Simon Property Group